Ram Bali Singh Yadav is an Indian politician from Bihar and a Member of the Bihar Legislative Assembly.Yadav won the Ghosi (Vidhan Sabha constituency) on the CPI(M–L)L ticket in the 2020 Bihar Legislative Assembly election.

References

Living people
Bihar MLAs 2020–2025
Communist Party of India (Marxist–Leninist) Liberation politicians
Year of birth missing (living people)